The guitarrón argentino is a stringed musical instrument from Argentina. It has 6 strings in 6 courses and is tuned B1, E2, A2, D3, G3, B3. The strings are made of nylon.

References
 The Stringed Instrument Database
 ATLAS of Plucked Instruments

Guitar family instruments
Argentine musical instruments